Nor Azwa Mohamed Di is a Malaysian lawn bowls international.

Nor won a bronze medal in the Women's fours at the Commonwealth Games in Kuala Lumpur with Siti Zalina Ahmad, Haslah Hassan and Nor Hashimah Ismail.

In 1999, she won the gold medal in the fours event at the 1999 Southeast Asian Games in Bandar Seri Begawan.

References

Living people
Year of birth missing (living people)
Malaysian people of Malay descent
Bowls players at the 1998 Commonwealth Games
Commonwealth Games bronze medallists for Malaysia
Commonwealth Games medallists in lawn bowls
Malaysian female bowls players
Southeast Asian Games medalists in lawn bowls
Competitors at the 1999 Southeast Asian Games
Southeast Asian Games gold medalists for Malaysia
Medallists at the 1998 Commonwealth Games